The HR postcode area, also known as the Hereford postcode area, is a group of nine postcode districts in England and Wales, which are subdivisions of six post towns. These cover most of Herefordshire, including Hereford, Bromyard, Kington, Ledbury, Leominster and Ross-on-Wye, while the HR2, HR3 and HR5 districts extend across the border to cover a small part of Powys.



Coverage
The approximate coverage of the postcode districts:

|-
! HR1
| HEREFORD
| North of centre
| Herefordshire Council
|-
! HR2
| HEREFORD
| South of centre
| Herefordshire Council, Powys
|-
! HR3
| HEREFORD
| West of centre; Hay on Wye
| Herefordshire Council, Powys
|-
! HR4
| HEREFORD
| City centre
| Herefordshire Council
|-
! HR5
| KINGTON
| 
| Herefordshire Council, Powys
|-
! HR6
| LEOMINSTER
| 
| Herefordshire Council
|-
! HR7
| BROMYARD
| 
| Herefordshire Council
|-
! HR8
| LEDBURY
| Ledbury, Bosbury
| Herefordshire Council
|-
! HR9
| ROSS-ON-WYE
| 
| Herefordshire Council
|}

Map

See also
Postcode Address File
List of postcode areas in the United Kingdom

References

External links
Royal Mail's Postcode Address File
A quick introduction to Royal Mail's Postcode Address File (PAF)
Using Welsh alternative addresses within Royal Mail's Postcode Address File (PAF)

Hereford
Postcode areas covering the West Midlands (region)
Postcode areas covering Wales